Shane Martin (born December 31, 1971) is an American politician serving as the member of the South Carolina Senate, where he has represented Spartanburg's 13th District since 2008. He is a member of the Republican Party.

Early life and education
Martin is a native resident of Spartanburg County.  He graduated in 1990 from Dorman High School.  After high school, he attended Clemson University, where he received bachelor's and master's degrees in mechanical engineering.  Before being elected as state senator, he was a school board trustee in Spartanburg District 6 (from 2005 to 2008).  He is also a small business owner, and works as an engineer, specializing in Aerodynamic Testing and Program management for Chevrolet.

South Carolina Senate
Martin was elected to the South Carolina Senate in 2008 and re-elected in 2012. He serves on the Corrections and Penology, Finance, Medical Affairs and Rules committees.

Personal life 
Martin has been married to his wife Amy since 1997. They have two children, Ashlyn and Aidan.

References

External links

Republican Party South Carolina state senators
1971 births
Living people
People from Spartanburg, South Carolina
Clemson University alumni
21st-century American politicians